The 1977 LFF Lyga was the 56th season of the LFF Lyga football competition in Lithuania.  It was contested by 27 teams, and Statybininkas Siauliai won the championship.

Group Zalgiris

Group Nemunas

Final

References
RSSSF

LFF Lyga seasons
1977 in Lithuania
LFF